There are over 9,000 Grade I listed buildings in England. This page is a list of these buildings in the City of York in North Yorkshire.

List of buildings

|}

See also
Grade II* listed buildings in the City of York
Grade I listed buildings in North Yorkshire
 Grade I listed buildings in Selby (district)
 Grade I listed buildings in Harrogate (borough)
 Grade I listed buildings in Craven
 Grade I listed buildings in Richmondshire
 Grade I listed buildings in Hambleton
 Grade I listed buildings in Ryedale
 Grade I listed buildings in Scarborough (borough)
 Grade I listed buildings in Redcar and Cleveland
 Grade I listed buildings in Middlesbrough (borough)
 Grade I listed buildings in Stockton-on-Tees

Notes

External links

Grade I listed buildings
Lists of Grade I listed buildings in North Yorkshire